Lee Brice is the fourth studio album by the American country music singer of the same name. It was released on November 3, 2017 via Curb Records. The album's lead single is "Boy".

Content
Brice first announced the album in mid-2017, following the release of lead single "Boy". He said that the "songs address themes of love, family and hard work." Brice co-produced with Dan Frizsell, Kyle Jacobs, Cody Labelle, and Jon Stone. "Boy" has charted within the Top 20 of Hot Country Songs.

"Songs in the Kitchen" was inspired by a quote from Kellie Pickler.

"American Nights" was previously recorded by Morgan Wallen on his 2016 EP, The Way I Talk and later recorded by the co-writer, Austin Jenckes, on his 2019 album, If You Grew Up Like I Did.

Critical reception
Sounds Like Nashville writer Chuck Dauphin gave the album a positive review, stating that "the best material on this disc comes from real life and appreciating your blessings of what you have in life".

Commercial performance
The album debuted at No. 36 on the Billboard 200, and No. 7 on the Top Country Albums, with 12,200 copies (15,000 album-equivalent units) sold in the first week.  As of July 2019, it has sold 49,600 copies in the United States, and accrued 288,000 album equivalent units.

Track listing

Personnel
Adapted from Lee Brice liner notes.
Musicians
 Jessi Alexander - background vocals
 Travis Bettis - acoustic guitar, electric guitar, slide guitar
 John Bohlinger - steel guitar,  background vocals
 Lee Brice - lead and background vocals, percussion, bass guitar, piano, acoustic guitar, electric guitar, mandolin, banjo, theremin, harmonica, programming
 Tom Bukovac - electric guitar, mandolin, banjo
 Brian Bunn - programming
 Joeie Canaday - bass guitar
 Dave Cohen - piano, synthesizer
 Stephanie Curry - background vocals
 Dan Fernandez - electric guitar
 Paul Franklin - steel guitar
 Dan Frizsell - bass guitar, programming
 Ben Glover - background vocals
 Michael Gray - percussion
 Warren Haynes - slide guitar on "I Dont Smoke" and "Story to Tell (Little Bird)"
 Morgan Herbert - background vocals
 Kyle Jacobs - piano, synthesizer
 Mike Johnson - steel guitar
 Charlie Judge - synthesizer
 Jeff King - electric guitar, mandolin
 Cody Labelle - programming
 Donnie Marple - drums, percussion
 Edwin McCain - acoustic guitar and background vocals on "Story to Tell (Little Bird)"
 Pat McGrath - acoustic guitar
 Rob McNelley - acoustic guitar
 Jerry McPherson - electric guitar
 Billy Montana - bass guitar, harmonica, background vocals
 Gordon Mote - piano, Hammond organ, Wurlitzer electric piano
 Paul Rippee - bass guitar
 Jerry Roe - drums
 Kristen Rogers - background vocals
 Adam Shoenfeld - electric guitar
 Jimmie Lee Sloas - bass guitar
 Reggie Smith - Hammond organ, clavinet, background vocals
 Jon Stone - electric guitar, background vocals
 Derek Wells - electric guitar
 John Willis - acoustic guitar
 Nir Z. - drums

Technical
 Lee Brice - producer (all tracks), executive producer
 Dan Frizsell - producer (all tracks except 12), recording, mixing
 Kyle Jacobs - producer (tracks 1, 2, 4-8, 10, 11)
 Cody Labelle - producer (track 12)
 Andrew Mendelson - mastering
 Jon Stone - producer (all tracks except 3, 12, 15)

Charts

Weekly charts

Year-end charts

Certifications

References

2017 albums
Lee Brice albums
Curb Records albums